Events in the year 1993 in Bulgaria.

Incumbents 

 President: Zhelyu Zhelev
 Prime Minister: Lyuben Berov

Events

Deaths
28 June – Boris Christoff, bass singer (b.1914).

References 

 
1990s in Bulgaria
Years of the 20th century in Bulgaria
Bulgaria
Bulgaria